Agdistis nigra is a moth in the family Pterophoridae. It is known from Cyprus and Israel.

The wingspan is about 18 mm. The forewings and hindwings are dark grey.

References

Agdistinae
Moths described in 1955